Lake Monowai (officially Monowai Lake) is a large lake in the southern part of Fiordland National Park, in New Zealand's South Island, 120 kilometres northwest of Invercargill. At an altitude of 180 metres in a long curved valley, the lake appears on maps shaped like a letter "U". The western part of the lake is set in beautiful mountainous country. It is drained in the northeast by the short Monowai River, which enters the Waiau River eight kilometres to the northeast.

Power station 

One of the South Island's oldest hydroelectric stations is powered by the waters of the Monowai. It is located at the junction of the Waiau and Monowai Rivers and was opened in 1925.

As a result of the Save Manapouri campaign, plans to raise the level of the lake to create more hydroelectric power were shelved by the Labour government of Norman Kirk in the 1970s, and an independent body, the Guardians of Lake Manapouri, Monowai, and Te Anau was created to oversee management of the lake levels (more information at Manapouri Power Station).

References 

Lakes of Fiordland